Events in the year 1915 in Germany.

Incumbents

National level
 Kaiser – Wilhelm II
 Chancellor – Theobald von Bethmann Hollweg

State level

Kingdoms
 King of Bavaria – Ludwig III of Bavaria
 King of Prussia – Kaiser Wilhelm II
 King of Saxony – Frederick Augustus III of Saxony
 King of Württemberg – William II of Württemberg

Grand Duchies
 Grand Duke of Baden – Frederick II
 Grand Duke of Hesse – Ernest Louis
 Grand Duke of Mecklenburg-Schwerin – Frederick Francis IV
 Grand Duke of Mecklenburg-Strelitz – Adolphus Frederick VI
 Grand Duke of Oldenburg – Frederick Augustus II
 Grand Duke of Saxe-Weimar-Eisenach – William Ernest

Principalities
 Schaumburg-Lippe – Adolf II, Prince of Schaumburg-Lippe
 Schwarzburg-Rudolstadt – Günther Victor, Prince of Schwarzburg
 Schwarzburg-Sondershausen – Günther Victor, Prince of Schwarzburg
 Principality of Lippe – Leopold IV, Prince of Lippe
 Reuss Elder Line – Heinrich XXIV, Prince Reuss of Greiz (with Heinrich XXVII, Prince Reuss Younger Line, as regent)
 Reuss Younger Line – Heinrich XXVII, Prince Reuss Younger Line
 Waldeck and Pyrmont – Friedrich, Prince of Waldeck and Pyrmont

Duchies
 Duke of Anhalt – Frederick II, Duke of Anhalt
 Duke of Brunswick – Ernest Augustus, Duke of Brunswick
 Duke of Saxe-Altenburg – Ernst II, Duke of Saxe-Altenburg
 Duke of Saxe-Coburg and Gotha – Charles Edward, Duke of Saxe-Coburg and Gotha
 Duke of Saxe-Meiningen – Bernhard III, Duke of Saxe-Meiningen

Colonial Governors
 Cameroon (Kamerun) – Karl Ebermaier (2nd and final term)
 German East Africa (Deutsch-Ostafrika) – Albert Heinrich Schnee
 German South-West Africa (Deutsch-Südwestafrika) – Theodor Seitz to 15 July

Events
9 July – German forces in German South-West Africa (Deutsch-Südwestafrika) capitulate and the territory is occupied by South Africa.
20 August – An auto parts, electronics and other manufacturing brand, ZF Friedrichshafen was founded, as predecessor name was Zepernicker Zahnradfabrik.

Undated
German geophysicist Alfred Wegener publishes his theory of Pangea, which he calls Urkontinent.
German palaeontologist Ernst Stromer publishes an article assigning the specimen to a new genus and species Spinosaurus aegyptiacus.

Births

 22 January – Heinrich Albertz, German politician (died 1993)
 27 January – Ernst Schröder, German actor (died 1994)
 14 February – Georg Thomalla, German actor (died 1999)
 21 February – Roland von Hößlin, German officer (died 1944)
 6 March – Hans-Ulrich von Oertzen, German officer (died 1944)
 7 March – Johannes Wiese, German pilot during World War II, a fighter ace (died 1991)
 11 March – Karl Krolow, German poet (died 1991)
 12 March – Reimar Horten, German aircraft pilots (died 1994)
 13 April:
 Max Jammer, German-born Israeli physicist (died 2010)
 Stephan Hermlin, German poet (died 1997)
 16 June – Marga Faulstich, German chemist (died 1998)
 25 August – Georg von Boeselager, German nobleman and an officer in the Wehrmacht (died 1944)
 26 August – Rolf Friedemann Pauls, German diplomat (died 2002)
 28 August – Paul Schneider-Esleben, German architect (died 2005)
 5 September – Horst Sindermann, German politician (died 1990)
 6 September – Franz Josef Strauss, German politician (died 1988)
 15 September – Helmut Schön, German football player and manager (died 1996)
 9 October – Henner Henkel, German tennis champion (died 1942)
 9 December - Elisabeth Schwarzkopf, German-British operatic soprano (died 2006)
 13 December – Curd Jürgens, German actor (died 1982)

Deaths

4 January – Anton von Werner, German painter (born 1843)
9 April – Friedrich Loeffler, German bacteriologist (born 1852)
2 May – Clara Immerwahr, German chemist (born 1870)
10 May – Karl Gotthard Lamprecht, German historian (born 1856)
15 May – Oskar Frenzel, German painter (born 1855)
20 June – Emil Rathenau, German entrepreneur and industrialist (born 1838)
9 July – Carl Walther, German gunsmith (born 1858)
15 July – Joseph Thyssen, German industrialist (born 1844)
4 August – Richard Kiepert, German cartographer (born 1846)
20 August – Paul Ehrlich, German physician and scientist (born 1854)
19 September – David Friedrich Weinland, German zoologist and novelist (born 1829)
27 September – Kaspar von Zumbusch, German sculptor (born 1830)
15 October – Theodor Boveri, German biologist (born 1862)
4 December – Gustav Hollaender, German violinist, composer and conductor (born 1855)
19 December – Alois Alzheimer , German psychiatrist and neuropathologist (born 1864)

References

 
Years of the 20th century in Germany
Germany
Germany